Catharine is an unincorporated community in Catherine Township, Ellis County, Kansas, United States.  As of the 2020 census, the population of the community and nearby areas was 113.

History
Volga German immigrants founded and settled Catharine in April 1876, naming it after Katharinenstadt, the town they came from in Russia. Katharinenstadt was the economic center of the German colonies in Russia and, as a result, Catharine's settlers were initially wealthier than those of other Volga German settlements in the area. More German settlers from Katharinenstadt arrived over the next two years followed by Austrians from Moravia beginning in 1878.

The community's first school opened in 1879 and doubled as a church until the completion of St. Catherine's Catholic Church in 1892. The first post office in Catharine opened in 1882.

Geography
It lies on the east side of North Fork Big Creek, part of the Smoky Hill River watershed, in the Smoky Hills region of the Great Plains.

Climate
The climate in this area is characterized by hot, humid summers and generally mild to cool winters. According to the Köppen Climate Classification system, Catharine has a humid subtropical climate, abbreviated "Cfa" on climate maps.

Demographics

For statistical purposes, the United States Census Bureau has defined Catharine as a census-designated place (CDP).

As of the 2010 census, there were 104 people, 49 households, and 29 families residing in the community. There were 59 housing units. The racial makeup of the community was 100.0% White. Hispanics or Latinos of any race were 1.0% of the population.

There were 49 households, out of which 28.6% had children under the age of 18 living with them, 53.1% were married couples living together, 4.1% had a male householder with no wife present, 2.0% had a female householder with no husband present, and 40.8% were non-families. 40.8% of all households were made up of individuals, and 16.3% had someone living alone who was 65 years of age or older. The average household size was 2.12, and the average family size was 2.86.

In the community, the population was spread out, with 19.2% under the age of 18, 6.6% from 18 to 24, 27.0% from 25 to 44, 32.8% from 45 to 64, and 14.4% who were 65 years of age or older. The median age was 41.5 years. For every 100 females, there were 92.6 males. For every 100 females age 18 and over, there were 104.9 males age 18 and over.

Education
The community is served by Hays USD 489 public school district.

Transportation
Catherine Road, a paved county road, runs east–west along the northern edge of the town.

Notable people
 Firmin Schmidt, Roman Catholic Bishop, was born in Catharine.
 Ron Schueler, Major League Baseball pitcher, coach and executive, was born in Catharine.

References

Further reading

External links
 Ellis County maps: Current, Historic, KDOT

German-Russian culture in Kansas
Census-designated places in Ellis County, Kansas
Census-designated places in Kansas